was a town located in Nasu District, Tochigi Prefecture, Japan.

As of 2003, the town had an estimated population of 6,939 and a density of 168.59 persons per km². The total area was 41.16 km².

On October 1, 2005, Ogawa, along with the town of Batō (also from Nasu District), was merged to create the town of Nakagawa.

External links
Nakagawa official website 

Dissolved municipalities of Tochigi Prefecture